Ridgeway is a neighborhood in the city of Lusaka, the capital of Zambia.

Location
The neighborhood is bordered by Independence Avenue to the north, Chitukuko Road to the east, Burma Road to the south and Nationalist Road to the west. The coordinates of the neighborhood are 15°26'05.0"S, 28°19'14.0"E (Latitude:-15.434736; Longitude:28.320553).

Overview
The neighborhood houses the following national institutions and buildings, among others:
 The teaching hospital of the University of Zambia School of Medicine
 Arakan Barracks, a unit of the Zambian Defence Force and the headquarters of the Zambia Army.
 National Archives of Zambia

See also
 Chelston
 Cathedral Hill
 Garden Township
 Matero

References

External links 
Website of Lusaka City Council
Lusaka: A Brief Cultural and Political History

Neighborhoods of Lusaka
Populated places in Zambia